The Scottish Open is a ranking professional snooker tournament held in the United Kingdom. The tournament had many name changes in its history, as the tournament was formerly called International Open, Matchroom Trophy and Players Championship. Apart from a hiatus in the 1990/1991 and 1991/1992 seasons, the tournament remained a ranking event until 2003/2004. In the 2012/2013 season the tournament was added back to the calendar as part of the Players Tour Championship minor-ranking series. The most recent champion is Luca Brecel.

On 29 April 2015, Barry Hearn announced it would return to the main tour in 2016 at the Emirates Arena Glasgow, as part of the new Home Nations Series with the existing Welsh Open, and the new English Open and Northern Ireland Open tournaments.

History 
The tournament began in 1981 as the International Open at the Assembly Rooms in Derby, and became the following year the second ranking event after the World Championship. The event moved to the Eldon Square in Newcastle upon Tyne. Until 1984 the event was sponsored by Jameson Whiskey.

In 1985 the event moved to the Trentham Gardens in Stoke-on-Trent and was renamed (for this year only) to the Matchroom Trophy due to sponsorship from Matchroom and Goya. The International Open name returned the following year and the sponsorship was overtaken by BCE (1986 and 1989) and Fidelity Unit Trusts (1987 and 1988). After 1989 the event went on a two-year hiatus.

The event returned in the 1992/1993 season with the sponsorship of Sky Sports. The event was moved to the second half of the season and was played at the Plymouth Pavilions. The event was moved again in 1994, this time to the Bournemouth International Centre. After an unsponsored year Sweater Shop took over for 1995 and 1996. In 1997 the event was moved to the Aberdeen Exhibition Centre and it was sponsored by Highland Spring.

In 1998 the event was renamed to Scottish Open, and it was sponsored by Imperial Tobacco through their Regal brand, who also sponsored the Scottish Masters and Welsh Open. In 2003 the event was moved to Royal Highland Centre in Edinburgh. For the first time in twelve years no top 16 player reached the final. The event than was renamed to the Players Championship for 2004, as it became the final event in the LG Electronics Tour. The event was sponsored by Daily Record and held at the SECC in Glasgow. After the event Sky decided not to renew their contract, and without television coverage the event was dropped. The event was added back to the calendar in the 2012/2013 season as minor-ranking tournament and was known as the Scottish Open. It was held at Ravenscraig as the fifth event of the European Tour.

In 2015 Barry Hearn announced that the tournament will return in the 2016/17 season. The event will be held in Glasgow and will be part of the Home Nations Series events, which will feature tournaments in the other home nations and have a one million pound bonus.

Steve Davis was the tournament's most prolific winner, with a record 6 wins from 8 finals. This included a 9–0 whitewash of Dennis Taylor in the 1981 final. There have been seven maximum breaks in the history of the tournament, out of which two were made at the 2000 event: one by Stephen Maguire at the first qualifying round against Phaitoon Phonbun, and the other by Ronnie O'Sullivan in the last 32 against Quinten Hann. In 2012 Kurt Maflin achieved a 147 in the last 32 against Stuart Carrington. In 2017, eventual runner-up Cao Yupeng made a maximum break in his first round match against Andrew Higginson, and the following year, John Higgins compiled his ninth career 147 in his second round match against Gerard Greene. In 2020, Zhou Yuelong made a maximum break in his first round match with Peter Lines, and the tournament's most recent maximum break was made in 2021 by Xiao Guodong in his qualifying match against Fraser Patrick.

Winners

References

 

Recurring sporting events established in 1981
1981 establishments in England
1998 establishments in Scotland
Players Tour Championship
Snooker ranking tournaments
Snooker competitions in Scotland